These are the results of the women's balance beam competition, one of six events for female competitors of the artistic gymnastics discipline contested in the gymnastics at the 2004 Summer Olympics in Athens. The qualification and final rounds took place on August 15 and August 23 at the Olympic Indoor Hall.

Results

Qualification

Eighty-five gymnasts competed in the balance beam event in the artistic gymnastics qualification round on August 15.
The eight highest scoring gymnasts advanced to the final on August 23.

Final

References
Gymnastics Results.com

Women's balance beam
2004
2004 in women's gymnastics
Women's events at the 2004 Summer Olympics